The Ch'ien Mu Library, named after Prof. Ch'ien Mu, is located in the New Asia College of the Chinese University of Hong Kong (CUHK). As one of the seven libraries of CUHK, the Ch'ien Mu Library houses the collections on Chinese Language and Literature, Fine Arts, Japanese Language and Literature and General Education, and provides various facilities including Exhibition Areas, 24-Hour study facilities, Group Study Rooms and Outdoor Reading Area.

Background 
The New Asia College Library was first founded as part of the New Asia College on Farm Road, Kowloon in 1954. As the New Asia College became one of the constituent colleges of the CUHK, the library was also moved into the Ma Liu Shui campus in 1973 and named "Jing Ye Guan" afterwards. In 1975, it was renamed after Prof. Ch'ien Mu, the founder of the New Asia College. The bust of Mr. Ch’ien Mu, sculpted by Prof. Wu Wei-shan who was director of the Academy of Fine Art of Nanking University, was placed in the lobby of the Ch’ien Mu Library in 2004. The design of the elevated mezzanine in the building is modelled after the library of Berea College in Kentucky, U.S.A.

Resources and facilities 
The collections of Ch’ien Mu Library focus on Chinese Language and Literature, Japanese Language and Literature and Fine Arts, in order to support the research activities and the teaching of programmes offered by the Department of Chinese Language and Literature, the Department of Japanese Studies and the Department of Fine Arts of the CUHK. In addition, the Library provides themed collections including the Ch'ien Mu Collection, New Asia College Collection, Local Art Archive and Art Collection.

Located on the lower ground floor, the Late Reading Room offers study space after the Library closes. On the ground floor, three Group Study Rooms and the learning cluster provide collaborative learning environment. Besides, the Exhibition Areas on the mezzanine floor and second floor were established in 2004 for CUHK students and staff to display their artworks.

External links 

 Chinese University of Hong Kong
 New Asia College
 New Asia College Ch'ien Mu Library

References 

Academic libraries in Hong Kong
Chinese University of Hong Kong
Libraries established in 1954